, born , was a Japanese actor, voice actor and Shin Buddhist priest from the city of Kyoto. He was affiliated with Granpapa Production.

Biography
Ishida was born in Kyoto, Japan on March 16, 1944, the son of actor Shigeki Ishida. He attended the Foreign Language Department (Spanish) of Sophia University, but quit without graduating. Ishida was also a chief priest at the Jōdo Shinshū Buddhist temple Jōkei-ji at Kanazawa, Ishikawa.

He was married to actress Fusako Tachibana until her death in 2006.

Ishida died on September 21, 2013 from myocardial infarction.

Filmography

Films
A Taxing Woman's Return (1988) – Kiyohara
Violent Cop (1989) – Detective Tomosato
Heaven and Earth (1990) – Takeda Nobushige
A Touch of Fever (1993) – Yoriko's Father
Oishinbo (1996) – Koizumi
Pride (1998) – Akira Mutō
Godzilla, Mothra and King Ghidorah: Giant Monsters All-Out Attack (2001) – SDF Officer
Quill (2004) – Hiroshi Totsuka
Doomsday: The Sinking of Japan (2006) – Minister of Defense Seigo Umezu
Departures (2008) – Sonezaki
Asahiyama Zoo Story: Penguins in the Sky – City Council Member

Television dramas
Oshin (1983)
Sanga Moyu (1984)
Musashibō Benkei (1986) – Kajiwara Kagetoki
Dokuganryū Masamune (1987) – Nihonmatsu Yoshitsugu
Kasuga no Tsubone (1989) – Ōkubo Tadachika
Shomuni (1998) – Kato
Aoi (2000) – Ōkubo Tadachika
The Family (2007) – Yasuda

Television animation
Alcatraz Connection – Assistant Inspector Terry Crown
Astro Boy: Mighty Atom – General Red
Black Jack – Toranomon
Detective Conan – Police Inspector Radish Redwood
GeGeGe no Kitarō (fifth series) – Vampire Elite Johnny
Requiem from the Darkness – Emon Shibamigi
Time Patrol-Tai Otasukeman – Napoleon
Space Brothers – Deneil Young

Original video animation (OVA)
Bio Hunter – Tabu
Giant Robo – Demon King of Chaos Fan Rui
Harlock Saga – Wotan
Legend of the Galactic Heroes – Heydrich Lang (second voice)
Record of Lodoss War – Emperor Beld

Theatrical animation
The Castle of Cagliostro (1979) – Count Cagliostro
Arcadia of My Youth (1982) – Zeda
Final Yamato (1983) – Lugal
The Dagger of Kamui (1985) – Tenkai, Saigō Takamori
Odin: Photon Sailer Starlight (as "Gentarō Ishida") (1985) – Saint Asgard
Fist of the North Star (1986) – Narrator
Akira (1988) – Colonel Shikishima
Little Nemo: Adventures in Slumberland (1989) – Nightmare King
Case Closed: The Time-Bombed Skyscraper (1997) – Teiji Moriya
Crayon Shin-chan: Blitzkrieg! Pig's Hoof's Secret Mission (1998) – Mouse
Metropolis (2001) – Duke Red
One Piece: Dead End Adventure (2003) – Gasparde
Brave Story (2006) – Bishop Daimon

Tokusatsu
Kamen Rider 555 – Joji Soeno
Juken Sentai Gekiranger – Kentaro Hisatsu
Ultraman Story – Father of Ultra

Video games
 Adventure of Tokyo Disney Sea ~Losing of Jewel's secret – King Triton
Dissidia: Final Fantasy (2008) – Exdeath
Kingdom Hearts (2002) – King Triton
Kingdom Hearts II (2005) – King Triton, Eeyore
Dissidia 012 Final Fantasy (2011) - Exdeath

Dubbing roles

Live-action
Gene Hackman
The Domino Principle – Roy Tucker
Superman II (1984 TV Asahi edition) – Lex Luthor
Under Fire – Alex Grazier
No Way Out (TV Tokyo edition) – Defense Secretary David Brice
Mississippi Burning (1992 TV Asahi edition) – Agent Rupert Anderson
The Package (1993 TBS edition) – Sgt. Johnny Gallagher
Loose Cannons – MacArthur Stern
Postcards from the Edge – Lowell Kolchek
Narrow Margin – Robert Caulfield
Class Action – Jedediah Tucker Ward
Unforgiven – Little Bill Daggett
Geronimo: An American Legend – Brig. Gen. George Crook
Wyatt Earp (1997 TV Tokyo edition) – Nicholas Earp
Crimson Tide – Captain Frank Ramsey
The Quick and the Dead – John Herod
The Birdcage (2000 Fuji TV edition) – Senator Kevin Keeley
The Chamber – Sam Cayhall
Extreme Measures – Dr. Lawrence Myrick
Absolute Power – President Alan Richmond
Enemy of the State (2003 Fuji TV edition) – Edward "Brill" Lyle
Under Suspicion – Henry Hearst
Behind Enemy Lines – Admiral Leslie McMahon Reigart
Heist – Joe Moore
The Royal Tenenbaums – Royal Tenenbaum
Runaway Jury – Rankin Fitch
Anthony Hopkins
The Silence of the Lambs (1995 TV Asahi edition) – Hannibal Lecter
Hannibal – Hannibal Lecter
Red Dragon (2006 TV Tokyo edition) – Hannibal Lecter
The City of Your Final Destination – Adam Gund
Peter Falk
Columbo – Lt. Columbo (Season 8~)
Undisputed – Mendy Ripstein
Next – Irv
48 Hrs. (1985 Nippon TV edition, as "Gentarō Ishida") – Jack Cates (Nick Nolte)
About Schmidt – Warren R. Schmidt (Jack Nicholson)
Alien 3 (1998 TV Asahi edition) – Leonard Dillon (Charles S. Dutton)
The Amityville Horror (1982 NTV edition) – George Lutz (James Brolin)
Apocalypse Now – Colonel Walter E. Kurtz (Marlon Brando)
Armour of God II: Operation Condor (1993 Fuji TV edition) – Adolf (Aldo Sambrell)
Batman Begins – William Earle (Rutger Hauer)
Batman Begins (2007 Nippon TV edition) – Carmine Falcone (Tom Wilkinson)
Batman Returns (1994 TV Asahi edition) – Oswald Cobblepot/The Penguin (Danny DeVito)
Beginners – Hal Fields (Christopher Plummer)
Ben-Hur (1979 Nippon TV edition) – Ben-Hur (Charlton Heston)
Big Fish – Old Edward Bloom (Albert Finney)
Brokeback Mountain – Joe Aguirre (Randy Quaid)
The Cannonball Run (1984 Fuji TV edition) – Doctor Nikolas Van Helsing (Jack Elam)
Cannonball Run II – Doctor Nikolas Van Helsing (Jack Elam)
Cocoon – Walter (Brian Dennehy)
Commando – Bennett (Vernon Wells)
Conan the Barbarian (1985 Nippon TV edition) – Thulsa Doom (James Earl Jones)
Cop Land (2000 Nippon TV edition) – Ray Donlan (Harvey Keitel)
Dances with Wolves – Kicking Bird (Graham Greene)
The Departed – Frank Costello (Jack Nicholson)
Die Hard 2 (1994 TV Asahi edition) – Trudeau (Fred Thompson)
Die Hard with a Vengeance (1998 Fuji TV edition) – Inspector Walter Cobb (Larry Bryggman)
ER – Richard Elliot (Armand Assante)
Evolution (2005 NTV edition) – Brigadier General Russell Woodman (Ted Levine)
First Blood (1985 NTV, 1990 TBS and 1995 TV Asahi editions) – Sheriff Will Teasle (Brian Dennehy)
Godzilla (2001 NTV edition) – Mayor Ebert (Michael Lerner)
Gone in 60 Seconds – Detective Roland Castlebeck (Delroy Lindo)
Green Zone – Martin Brown (Brendan Gleeson)
The Imaginarium of Doctor Parnassus – Doctor Parnassus (Christopher Plummer)
Indiana Jones and the Temple of Doom (1987 Nippon TV edition) – Mola Ram (Amrish Puri)
K-9 (1993 TV Asahi edition) – Lyman (Kevin Tighe)
Lawrence of Arabia (1981 TV Asahi edition) – Colonel Harry Brighton (Anthony Quayle)
The Lord of the Rings: The Two Towers – Treebeard (John Rhys-Davies)
Men in Black (2001 Nippon TV edition) – Chief Zed (Rip Torn)
Men in Black II (2005 TV Asahi edition) – Chief Zed (Rip Torn)
The NeverEnding Story – Falkor, Gmork (Alan Oppenheimer)
Project A – San (Dick Wei)
The Punisher – Jake Berkowitz (Louis Gossett Jr.)
Raiders of the Lost Ark – Belloq (Paul Freeman)
The Raven – Captain Charles Hamilton (Brendan Gleeson)
Robin Hood – Sir Walter Loxley (Max von Sydow)
The Running Man (1989 Fuji TV edition) – Damon Killian (Richard Dawson)
Saw series – Jigsaw Killer (Tobin Bell)
The Shining (1996 TV Tokyo edition) – Jack Torrance (Jack Nicholson)
Silent Hill: Revelation – Leonard Wolf (Malcolm McDowell)
Sleuth – Andrew Wyke (Michael Caine)
The Smurfs 2 – Victor Doyle (Brendan Gleeson)
The Empire Strikes Back (1992 TV Asahi edition) – Darth Vader (James Earl Jones)
The Sting (1991 TV Asahi edition) – Lieutenant William Snyder (Charles Durning)
This Boy's Life – Dwight Hansen (Robert De Niro)

Animation
The Book of Pooh – Eeyore
Cars 2 – Mel Dorado
The Fox and the Hound – Adult CopperThe Little Mermaid (re-release edition) – King TritonThe Little Mermaid II: Return to the Sea – King TritonOliver and Company – SykesPeter Pan (Buena Vista edition) – Indian ChiefPlanes – Skipper RileyPooh's Grand Adventure: The Search for Christopher Robin – EeyoreShark Tale – Don FeinbergThe Tigger Movie – EeyoreWinnie-the-Pooh – Eeyore

Japanese voiceoverPeter Pan's Flight – Indian ChiefPooh's Hunny Hunt'' – Eeyore

References

External links

1944 births
2013 deaths
Japanese male voice actors
Japanese Buddhist clergy
Male voice actors from Kyoto
Jōdo Shinshū Buddhist priests
Japanese male film actors
Japanese male stage actors
Japanese male television actors
Japanese male video game actors
20th-century Japanese male actors
21st-century Japanese male actors